Musa II was mansa of the Mali Empire from 1374 to 1387.

Musa II took the throne following the death of his father, Mansa Mari Diata II.
He was succeeded by his brother Maghan II.

See also
Mali Empire
Keita Dynasty

1387 deaths
Mansas of Mali
People of the Mali Empire
14th-century monarchs in Africa
Year of birth unknown
Keita family